The Democrat Party (Partido Demócrata) of Chile was a Chilean political party created by a left-wing faction of the Radical Party in 1887. It was created to protect the working and middle class, but over the years it became a traditional political movement, with factions of center-right and center-left.

Luis Emilio Recabarren was active in the party until 1912, when he founded the Socialist Workers Party (POS), which later changed its name to the Communist Party.

Presidential candidates 

The following is a list of the presidential candidates supported by the Democrat Party.
1896: Vicente Reyes (lost)
1901: Germán Riesco (won)
1906: Zenón Torrealba Ilabaca (lost)
1910: Ramón Barros Luco (won)
1915: Javier Ángel Figueroa (lost)
1920: Arturo Alessandri (won)
1925: Emiliano Figueroa (won)
1927: none
1931: Arturo Alessandri (lost)
1932: Arturo Alessandri (won)
1938: Gustavo Ross (lost)

References

Defunct political parties in Chile
Political parties established in 1887
Political parties disestablished in 1941
1887 establishments in Chile
1941 disestablishments in Chile